Chehalis is a city in and the county seat of Lewis County, Washington. The population was 7,439 at the time of the 2020 census.

Incorporated in 1883, Chehalis was primarily a logging and railroad town, with a shift towards farming in the mid-20th century. The city has bolstered its economy in the 21st century with a focus in manufacturing and warehousing.   The city has several distinct historical areas and boasts 11 locations on the list of National Register of Historic Places, more than any other region in Lewis County.

Etymology
The Native American Chehalis people described, using their language and pronunciation, a location and village in present-day Westport, Washington that translates to American English as "place of sand" or "shifting sand". Early non-native explorers of the Pacific Northwest vocalized the words as "Chehalis" and proceeded to describe the original inhabitants as such.

The town of Saundersville, Washington, named after S.S. Saunders on whose donation land claim it was founded, began to officially use the word "Chehalis" in 1879 to denote its location to the Chehalis people and the Chehalis River. The translations were also fitting for the growing town due to the muddy bottomland along the Chehalis River which had long vexed stagecoach travelers on the Washington arm of the Oregon Trail between Kalama and New Market (now Tumwater).

History
Chehalis began as a settlement around a warehouse beside a railroad track in 1873, when the Northern Pacific Railroad built northward from Kalama to Tacoma.  Northern Pacific's decision bypassed the town of Claquato, then the county seat.  This allowed Chehalis, in 1874, to become the central location for Lewis County government. That same year, a store was added to the warehouse, and a courthouse and several houses were constructed. Chehalis was incorporated on November 23, 1883.

Logging soon began in the nearby forests. Lumber workers of Scandinavian, English, and Scots-Irish descent arrived and settled in the neighboring valleys. In 1940, the chief local industries were: dairying, poultry raising, fruit growing, milk condensing, fruit and vegetable packing, brick and tile manufacturing, coal mining, portable house manufacturing, and fern shipping.

A vessel in the United States Navy, the gunboat USS Chehalis (PGM-94), was named in honor of the city.

Claquato
Begun as a settlement in 1853 by Lewis Hawkins Davis, who originally named the area Davis Prairie, the town grew quickly to include Claquato Church, a cemetery, hotels, and several stores and was, for a time, the largest populated town between the Columbia River and Olympia.  By 1858 the town would become the county seat for Lewis County until that designation was transferred to Chehalis in 1874.

Claquato is no longer a recognized town or municipality, and is considered a neighborhood outside the Chehalis city limits. While described as a ghost town as it was officially vacated in 1902, the area has been populated since its inception.

Translated from the Chehalis Native American language, Claquato means "high prairie" or "high land".

Geography

The city straddles Interstate 5 at a point almost exactly halfway between Seattle, Washington and Portland, Oregon. The historic downtown and most of the city's amenities lie on the east side of the freeway, nestled at the base of a small range of forested hills. On the west side of the freeway are parks, farms, a few subdivisions developed in the hills to the west, and a centralized shopping district, the Twin City Town Center. The Chehalis–Centralia Airport is located immediately west of the freeway towards the northern end of the city. From numerous vantage points in the hills just west of town, one can see Mount Rainier, Mount Adams, and Mount St. Helens, depending on weather conditions.

The Chehalis River winds its way through the valley in which the city resides, and is joined by a tributary, the Newaukum River. This confluence of waters, along with the intersections of tributaries and railroads within Chehalis, helped the city become known as "The Maple Leaf City". Both the Chehalis and Newaukum rivers are prone to flooding during periods of abnormally heavy or persistent rain, and the lowlands from the freeway westward are particularly susceptible to inundation. A variety of local groups, scientists, and government have organized a partnership called "The Chehalis Basin Strategy" to propose and research a combination of plans along the Chehalis River to mitigate flooding and to restore aquatic habitat for local Chinook salmon. The current proposal outlines several flood control reduction measures, including levee improvements at the local airport and a flood retention dam in Pe Ell.

Climate
This region experiences warm (but not hot) and dry summers, with no average monthly temperatures above 71.6 °F (22.0 °C). According to the Köppen Climate Classification system, Chehalis has a warm-summer Mediterranean climate, abbreviated "Csb" on climate maps.

The highest temperature ever recorded in the city was 107.0 °F (41.7 °C) in July 2009.  Chehalis would match that record high on June 28, 2021, while surpassing other daily and monthly heat records for the month during the 2021 Western North America heat wave.

Demographics

2010 census
As of the census of 2010, there were 7,259 people, 2,868 households, and 1,655 families residing in the city. The racial makeup of the city was 87.0% White, 1.7% African American, 1.3% Native American, 1.3% Asian, 0.2% Pacific Islander, 5.7% from other races, and 2.8% from two or more races. Hispanic or Latino of any race were 11.6% of the population.

There were 2,868 households, of which 31.1% had children under the age of 18 living with them, 36.9% were married couples living together, 14.9% had a female householder with no husband present, 6.0% had a male householder with no wife present, and 42.3% were non-families. 35.3% of all households were made up of individuals, and 16.8% had someone living alone who was 65 years of age or older. The average household size was 2.36 and the average family size was 3.02.

The median age in the city was 33.5 years. 24.5% of residents were under the age of 18; 12.5% were between the ages of 18 and 24; 25.9% were from 25 to 44; 22.6% were from 45 to 64; and 14.4% were 65 years of age or older. The gender makeup of the city was 50.2% male and 49.8% female.

2000 census
As of the census of 2000, there were 7,057 people, 2,671 households, and 1,696 families residing in the city. The population density was 1,259.0 people per square mile (485.7/km2). There were 2,871 housing units at an average density of 512.2 per square mile (197.6/km2). The racial makeup of the city was 89.56% White, 1.35% African American, 1.46% Native American, 1.20% Asian, 0.24% Pacific Islander, 3.95% from other races, and 2.24% from two or more races. Hispanic or Latino of any race were 7.91% of the population. 18.4% were of German, 11.0% English, 11.0% American and 8.4% Irish ancestry.

There were 2,671 households, out of which 33.2% had children under the age of 18 living with them, 43.8% were married couples living together, 14.4% had a female householder with no husband present, and 36.5% were non-families. 30.4% of all households were made up of individuals, and 15.1% had someone living alone who was 65 years of age or older. The average household size was 2.46 and the average family size was 3.06.

In the city, the population was spread out, with 29.2% under the age of 18, 11.4% from 18 to 24, 26.6% from 25 to 44, 18.9% from 45 to 64, and 14.0% who were 65 years of age or older. The median age was 32 years. For every 100 females, there were 102.0 males. For every 100 females age 18 and over, there were 94.0 males.

The median income for a household in the city was $33,482, and the median income for a family was $41,387. Males had a median income of $32,289 versus $24,414 for females. The per capita income for the city was $15,944. About 16.0% of families and 19.8% of the population were below the poverty line, including 27.6% of those under age 18 and 8.9% of those age 65 or over.

Economy

I.P. Callison's & Sons, also known succinctly as Callison's, was founded in the city in 1903. The company originally processed cascara bark, used as a laxative, expanding to produce peppermint in the 1940s, spearmint in 1952, and eventually essential oils. The company headquarters and exporting components were moved to Lacey but the manufacturing plant remains in Chehalis.

Arts and culture

Festivals and events
Chehalis borders the Southwest Washington Fairgrounds, which hosts an annual state fair, usually in August.

An annual, multi-day "ChehalisFest" is usually held at the end of July.  Hosted by Experience Chehalis (previously the Chehalis Community Renaissance Team), the festival is centrally located in the historic downtown district but expands to local tourist locations, including the Chehalis-Centralia Airport and Veterans Memorial Museum.  Food, music, child activities, art walks, sidewalk sales, and car shows are often the highlights of the festivities.

The city hosts a yearly, June-to-October, Community Farmers Market of Chehalis in its historic downtown.  The market, part of a larger Lewis County farmers market initiative, is opened on Tuesday afternoons, with a supplemental Friday opening in recent years.  Local produce and foodstuffs, art wares, and child activities are often the leading focus of the market.

A mid-summer Music in the Park free concert series takes place annually at Recreation Park.  The event is typically held on three consecutive Fridays, with a different performer each evening.  Based on local music demographics, country singers and cover bands often headline the series.

Chehalis's Santa Parade takes place in early December. A theme is chosen every year and local residents are selected as grand marshals as recognition for their community service. The route courses thru the historic downtown district and immediate business core with floats and school marching bands the prime spotlight of the event.  Held almost continuously since the 1940s, the parade celebrated 70 years in 2019.

Historic buildings and sites

The Chehalis Historic Downtown District was honored with placement on the National Register of Historic Places in 1997, notably for its Colonial Revival architecture.
Other locations within Chehalis listed on the register include the Hillside Historic District, the Lewis County Courthouse, the St. Helens Hotel, the Troop 373 and 7373 Scout Lodge, the main U.S. Post Office building, and the houses of John R. Jackson, O.B. McFadden, and O.K. Palmer.

The Vernetta Smith Chehalis Timberland Library is operated by the Timberland Regional Library and named in honor of the mother of former Chehalis resident, Orin Smith, the library's chief donor. It was completed in 2008 after the original Carnegie library (opened in 1910) and Chehalis City Hall were torn down in September 2007.

The former Northern Pacific Railway depot that opened in 1912 was renamed the Lewis County Historical Society and Museum.  Following renovations to save the building following its closure in 1972, the museum celebrated its grand reopening on September 18, 1979, with a five-day festival.  A large tree stump by its main entrance has been used as a podium by Franklin and Theodore Roosevelt, Eugene Debs, and William Howard Taft.  It was recognized with placement on the NRHP list in 1974.

The Washington Hotel opened in 1889 and was restored by a local family in 1997 following a destructive fire.  The efforts would earn the building a Washington State Preservation Award in 1999. The hotel once served a movie house and vaudeville theater, known as the Dream Theatre, which opened in 1911. Since its construction, the structure has been home to several small businesses, once including the Vintage Motorcycle Museum. A Dream Theater ghost sign is visible on the front entrance side of the structure.

The Chehalis Theater was originally the Pix Theater when it was opened in 1938, but renamed in 1954.  Formerly called the Beau Arts Building when built in 1923, the location was first home to a Ford car dealership.  The building was converted into a movie house and continued to host film viewing until 1988.  Owing to fiscal losses and maintenance backlogs, the theater would be repurposed for various businesses before closing to any economic activity in 2008. Amid changing ownerships since 2016, extensive renovation was undertaken which has led it to be reopened for performances, screenings, and cuisine.

To commemorate the 100th anniversary of Ezra Meeker's journey on the Oregon Trail, the city, by way of the Lewis County Historical Society, installed an historical marker at city hall. As part of a promise from towns along Meeker's trip to erect markers to honor the trail, Chehalis was one of the last areas to fulfill the obligation. Another marker was subsequently placed at Claquato Church in the nearby neighborhood of Claquato, the oldest continuously used church in Washington state.

Public art
Based on a plan approved by the city council in 2009, the Chehalis Community Renaissance Team (CCRT) was formed and implemented artistic improvements as part of long term revitalization project for downtown Chehalis.  With funds provided by CCRT via local donations and various local and state programs, local artists and business owners have produced artworks on utility boxes, trash can lids, and benches, along with additional murals and building façade renovations in the downtown and surrounding business districts.

Tourism
The Veteran's Memorial Museum, originally begun in 1995 and opened in Centralia in 1997, is based in the city.  The museum contains a volumetric library of military history, and visitors can participate in direct interactions with visiting United States war veterans as well as browse thru a 9,000 square foot gallery.

A swap meet mall, Yardbirds, is a local landmark known for its large, metal and wood sculpture of a black bird.

Sports
Bicycling is a popular sport in Chehalis, hosting along with other towns on the Washington State Route 6 corridor an annual "Ride The Willapa" bike ride that raises money for the Willapa Hills Trail.  The Lewis County Historic Bike Ride, a yearly event for over 30 years, features ride options that vary from easy to advanced, and starts in the area.  Riders in the Seattle to Portland Bicycle Classic will overnight in the city as an overflow option to Centralia.

Chehalis's Millet Field used to host minor league baseball, including such teams as the Gophers, Proteges, and Farmers, and semi-pro baseball and football, from the turn of the 20th century into the 1970s.  Several Negro League games were played in the town.

Two parks within the city limits, Recreation and Stan Hedwall Parks, are used for a variety of W.F. West High School sports competitions and for tournaments involving high schools within Lewis County.

Parks and recreation

The city has several parks, some on land donated by Chehalis residents.  Money raised to build, maintain, or upgrade the area's park system has long been done by community fundraising efforts.

The largest park complex is located in Chehalis's South Market district and contains four separate units.  The Gail and Carolyn Shaw Aquatics Center' opened in August 2014 and it replaced the original 1959 Chehalis Community Pool. The Chet and Henrietta Rhodes Spray Park, completed in 2007, adjoins the aquatic center, geared mostly for young children and people with disabilities. Recreation Park is the largest of the area, and is home to four softball and youth baseball fields, picnic areas, paved walking paths, and a community center and kitchen. It was recently rebuilt in 2020 along with the abutting Penny Playground, a fenced play area geared for children.  The playground's name comes from the donation drives used to help fund the building of the park in 1993.

Two additional parks are furnished for athletics and organized sports. Stan Hedwall Park straddles the Newaukum River with 200 acres of ball fields, RV parking, trails, and open and forested areas. Millett Field was formerly home to a semi-pro baseball team in the early 20th century, and regularly used for sports since it opened in 1898 and developed in 1908. A basketball court and a playground area, both created by local charitable acts in the early 2000s, are the focus of the  park.

Several parks organized and built for leisure and family activities are dispersed within the city limits. Westside Park, located in the Pennsylvania Avenue-West Side Historic District, contains basketball courts, a playground, and picnic areas. Lintott-Alexander Park, located on land that was donated in the 20th century by a Chehalis family is a  park that was restored beginning in 2004. A pair of the oldest recreational areas in the city, John Dobson and McFadden Parks, are a combined  and are located in the Hillside District. A shared trail, the Dobson-McFadden, bridges the parks and leads to open views to much of Chehalis, including downtown, and the Newaukum River valley.

Several Chehalis parks contain walking paths and trails but there are three separate trails of note. The Airport Levee Trail is a mixed paved-gravel trail that loops for up to 3.5 miles and is situated between farm land and the Chehalis-Centralia Airport. It connects with the nearby Airport Road Trail, a paved, 2-mile mixed use trail that parallels Interstate 5; it is part of long term plan to link the recreational areas between the Twin Cities. The Willapa Hills Trail stretches 56 miles from Chehalis to South Bend, Washington. Built over a late 19th century railroad, it is now a mix of paving and compact gravel and is open to hikers, bicyclists, and horse riding.

Environment and ecology
The city owns and operates the Chehalis Poplar Tree Farm located east of Claquato on State Route 6. The 11-unit,  site grows nine hybrid varieties of poplar and the trees are harvested every 8 to 10 years, per unit, on a rotating basis. The lumber is sold to produce paper. The farm is part of Chehalis' water treatment program where, thru use of irrigation pipes finished in 2008, Class 1 wastewater is used to hydrate the fields rather than be fully discharged in the Chehalis River as was common practice before the tree farm was created. Reclaimed and treated water not absorbed by the poplars recharges the local aquifer. The farm was informally known as the "Chehalis Poplar Tree Plantation" and was renamed to its current moniker in 2021 due to local action requesting the removal of the word "plantation" as the term was considered objectionable.

The area is populated by cascara, defined as a bush or tree depending on its size. The main harvesting of the plant is for its bark, commonly used as a laxative. The local company, I.P. Callsion's & Sons, began its operations in 1903 by processing the bark for a drug manufacturer.

Government and politics
Chehalis has a council–manager system of government that consists of an elected city council and an appointed city manager. The city council has seven members, of which three come from at-large seats, and selects a ceremonial mayor from its members.

The city is located in District 1 of Lewis County and as of March 2021, represented by County Commissioner Sean Swope.

Politics
Chehalis is recognized as being majority Republican and conservative, although slightly less so than Lewis County as a whole.

The results for the 2020 U.S. Presidential Election for all Chehalis voting districts were as follows:

 Donald J. Trump (Republican) - 1,877 (53.19%)
 Joe Biden (Democrat) - 1,498 (42.45%)
 Jo Jorgensen (Libertarian) - 121 (3.43%)
 Other candidates - 18 (0.51%)
 Write-in candidate - 15 (0.43%)

The results for the 2016 U.S. Presidential Election for all Chehalis voting districts were as follows:

 Donald J. Trump (Republican) - 1,458 (53.92%)
 Hillary Rodham Clinton (Democrat) - 1,011 (37.39%)
 Gary Johnson (Libertarian) - 164 (6.07%)
 Jill Stein (Green) - 51 (1.89%)
 Darrell Castle (Constitution) - 9 (0.33%)
 Other candidates - 11 (0.51%)

Education
The Chehalis School District (CSD) provides public education to students, from pre-kindergarten to 12th grade, in the city.

The following public schools are:

 James W. Lintott Elementary - Pre-kindergarten to 2nd grade
 Orin C. Smith Elementary - Third to 5th grade
 Chehalis Middle School - Built in 1989, hosts grades 6th thru 8th
 W.F. West High School - Opened in 1951, receives students from 9th to 12th grades

Both elementary schools were built concurrent in 2018 and fully opened in 2019.  They replaced the previous primary schools of Cascade (built 1922), R.E.Bennet (opened in 1928), and Olympic (built 1960).

The city also provides schooling for rehabilitating juvenile males at Green Hill School, with options for students to obtain a high school or general equivalency diploma (GED), vocational training, or college prep courses.

Media

Newspapers
The earliest recorded newspaper published in Chehalis was in 1883, the Lewis County Bee, with the Lewis County Nugget forming a year later.  In 1888, both publications dropped the county title and became the Chehalis Bee and the Chehalis Nugget.  The city would host up to three competing papers for brief periods in the 1890s until 1905.  The Bee and Nugget merged in 1898 to become the Chehalis Bee-Nugget, surviving until 1938 when it joined with the Lewis County Advocate to become The Chehalis Advocate.  With the exception of a brief upstart of a daily publication in the 1950s, named the Scoop, the merger left Chehalis with one surviving news publication produced in the city.  The Chehalis Advocate, due to a loss of ad revenue and rising costs, folded in 1963.

Since then, local news reports for the residents of Chehalis are provided by The Chronicle, a newspaper with an online component.  Produced in Centralia, the news organization also provides reports on Washington state and national issues, as well as features about community and historical events throughout Lewis County.

A ghost sign for the Chehalis Bee-Nugget was found in 2009, and subsequently preserved, during a renovation of Chehalis's historic St. Helens Theater.

Film and Television
Several movies have been filmed in and around Chehalis, including Captain Fantastic, and the independent film Maysville.  Diverse documentaries filmed in the city include the environmental feature about the Chehalis river basin, Chehalis : A Watershed Moment, and the movie, Skinny and Fatty: The Story of Yard Birds, a reflection on a local market attraction.

Izzie Stevens, a fictional character from the television show, Grey's Anatomy, was born and raised in Chehalis.

Radio
The Chehalis area has two licensed FM radio stations, KACS - 90.5 FM, which broadcasts a Christian format, and KMNT - 104.3 FM, providing country music to the community.  Additional stations include Centralia College owned KCED - 91.3 FM, which transmits Alternative programming, and the Adult contemporary music radio broadcaster KITI-FM - 95.1 FM, based in Winlock.

Infrastructure

Transportation
Chehalis is served by Interstate 5, the main north–south freeway in Western Washington, which connects the city to Seattle and Portland. The freeway also carries a section of U.S. Route 12, an east–west highway that continues to Aberdeen and across the Cascades to the Yakima River Valley and Tri-Cities. State Route 6 terminates in Chehalis and travels west to a junction with U.S. Route 101 in Raymond, located on Willapa Bay.

Twin Transit provides public transit service to Chehalis and neighboring Centralia, with connections to other communities. Early 20th century public transportation for residents relied on a streetcar line operated by the local Twin City Railroad Company, which connected the city with neighboring Centralia.  The service was discontinued by 1929 in favor of busses.

The Chehalis–Centralia Airport (CLS) is located within the city limits.  The airport is a single runway, public use hub for air travel in Lewis County.  First begun as a small airfield in 1927, it is bordered by the local shopping district and I-5 and is approximately one mile west of the Chehalis downtown district.   It is the largest of the three airports within the county.

Utilities
Lewis County PUD provides electricity within the city, 75% generated via hydroelectricity.  The City of Chehalis Water Division is responsible for clean drinking water, including water treatment and operations maintenance.  Natural gas and infrastructure for residents and businesses within the city limits is provided by Puget Sound Energy.

Chehalis received grants of $4.45 million in 2021 to build the first hydrogen fueling station in Washington state; it is to be initially overseen by Twin Transit. The self-service facility will have two fuel pressure stations, light-duty and heavy duty, of 700 and 350-bar fuel pressure, respectively.

The city first installed EV charging stations in 2018. Located in the Twin City Shopping Center, on land owned by the airport, the area originally held 4 stations. A contract amendment in February 2022 allowed for an expansion of four more stalls and a new contract the following month permitted the building of 8 additional stations.

Healthcare
Chehalis is served by Centralia's 128-bed, non-profit Providence Centralia Hospital for short-term acute care that also provides services for surgery, cancer, obstetrics, and is equipped with a 24-hour emergency room and an ICU. There are several clinics in Chehalis, including Providence Chehalis Family Medicine, Northwest Pediatric Care, and Chehalis Children's Clinic. Mental health services are provided by Cascade Mental Health Care. A detox and addiction recovery center is run by American Behavioral Health Systems at the former site of St. Helens Hospital that was built in 1907.

The Lewis County Public Health & Social Services building is located in the government district of the city, north of the Lewis County Courthouse.

Sister city
Chehalis has been a sister city with Inasa, Shizuoka, Japan since 1990. It merged into the city of Hamamatsu, which continues the relationship.

Chehalis is considered a twin city with adjacent Centralia.

Notable people
 Kay Bell, football player and professional wrestler
 Morgan Christen, United States federal appellate judge
 Henry C. Davis, Washington state pioneer and businessman
 Frank Everett, Washington state pioneer and businessman
 Judianne Fotheringill, 1963 and 1964 pair skating U.S. national champion
 Dave and Vean Gregg, professional baseball players
 Olive McKean, Bronze medalist swimmer at the  1936 Summer Olympics
 Seton I. Miller, Oscar winner in 1941 for Best Screenplay
 Elmer Schwartz, professional football player in the 1930s
 Orin Smith, former CEO of Starbucks
 Warren A. Taylor, first Speaker of the Alaska House of Representatives
 Ralph Towner, acoustic guitarist
 Albert E. Tozier, founder of the Chehalis Nugget newspaper  
 Harry R. Truman, 1980 Mt. St. Helens eruption folk hero
 William Muir Urquhart, Chehalis pioneer and businessman

Notes

References

External links

 City of Chehalis website
 Experience Chehalis website
 

 

 
Cities in Lewis County, Washington
County seats in Washington (state)
Washington placenames of Native American origin